The Social Democrats of Bosnia and Herzegovina (Bosnian: Socijaldemokrate Bosne i Hercegovine (SD BiH) / Социјалдемократе Босне и Херцеговине) is a social-democratic political party in Bosnia and Herzegovina.

History
The Social Democrats of Bosnia and Herzegovina (SD BiH) were formed in Tuzla, Bosnia and Herzegovina on 7 September 2019. The party was formed after disagreements within the membership of the Social Democratic Party of Bosnia and Herzegovina. Founder Enver Bijedić was chosen as president of the party.

The SD BiH currently have two seats in the 	Tuzla Cantonal Assembly.

Ideology
Much like the Social Democratic Party, the Social Democrats are a left-wing democratic party. The program vision corresponds to values and ideas of social democracy in Europe and the world. The SD BiH is a civic party that is particularly interested in improving the social status of workers, rural population, students, youth, veterans, women, pensioners and citizens of Bosnia and Herzegovina in the diaspora.

Elections

Parliamentary elections

Cantonal elections

References

External links
Official website

2019 establishments in Bosnia and Herzegovina
Political parties established in 2019
Pro-European political parties in Bosnia and Herzegovina
Secularism in Bosnia and Herzegovina
Social democratic parties in Europe
Social democratic parties in Bosnia and Herzegovina